Grace Episcopal Church, built in 1867, is an historic Episcopal church located at 1041 Wisconsin Avenue, NW, in the Georgetown neighborhood of Washington, D.C. Historically known as Grace Protestant Episcopal Church, it was added under that name to the National Register of Historic Places on May 6, 1971. It is also known as Mission Church for Canal Boatmen.

Grace Church is an active parish in the Episcopal Diocese of Washington. The Rev. John Graham is the current rector.

See also

List of Registered Historic Places in the District of Columbia

References

External links

 Grace Episcopal Church website
 Grace Episcopal Church Blog

Churches completed in 1867
19th-century Episcopal church buildings
Churches on the National Register of Historic Places in Washington, D.C.
Episcopal churches in Washington, D.C.
Gothic Revival church buildings in Washington, D.C.
Historic district contributing properties in Washington, D.C.
Religious organizations established in 1855
1855 establishments in Washington, D.C.
Churches in Georgetown (Washington, D.C.)